Mary Arshagouni Papazian (born Mary Ellen Arshagouni; February 25, 1959) is the former president of San Jose State University. She has had over 25 years of prior experience in academia, having been the past president of Southern Connecticut State University and the Provost and Senior Vice President for Academic Affairs at Lehman College. She resigned from her post in 2021.

Early life and education 
Papazian was born Mary Ellen Arshagouni to a family of Armenian descent in Santa Monica, California on February 25, 1959. Raised in the San Fernando Valley, she attended Ferrahian High School, an Armenian private school in Encino. 

Papazian has a B.A. (1981), M.A. (1983), and Ph.D. (1988) in English literature from University of California, Los Angeles (UCLA).

Career 
Papazian started out as an assistant, associate and tenured professor of English at Oakland University. After her teaching career, she continued her work in education. From 1999 to 2004, she was associate dean of the College of Arts and Sciences at Oakland University in Michigan and was also executive director of the department of music, theater, and dance at Oakland from 2003 to 2004. She then served as dean of the College of Humanities and Social Sciences at Montclair State University in New Jersey from 2004 to 2007. Papazian was provost and senior vice president for academic affairs at Lehman College, City University of New York from 2007 to 2011.

From February 1, 2012 to June 30, 2016, Papazian was president of Southern Connecticut State University.

On January 27, 2016, the California State University Board of Trustees named Papazian the 30th president of San Jose State University, beginning July 1.

On October 7, 2021, Papazian announced that she would resign as the president of San José State University at the end of the 2021 fall semester.

Research and academic interests 
Papazian's dissertation at UCLA was titled John Donne's "Devotions upon Emergent Occasions": A Puritan Reading. She has edited two books, John Donne and the Protestant Reformation and Sacred and Profane in English Renaissance Literature as well as numerous articles on Donne.

Works 

 John Donne and the Protestant Reformation (Wayne State UP, 2003), editor
 Sacred and Profane in English Renaissance Literature (U of Delaware P, 2008), editor

Personal life
She married Dennis Papazian in 1991; they have two daughters.

References 

1959 births
Living people
Southern Connecticut State University faculty
Lehman College faculty
University of California, Los Angeles alumni
Oakland University faculty
Montclair State University faculty
American people of Armenian descent
People from Santa Monica, California
People from the San Fernando Valley
Presidents of San Jose State University